GJ 3379 (Giclas 99-49) is the nearest star in the Orion constellation, located at a distance of 17 light years from the Sun based on parallax. It is a single star with an apparent visual magnitude of +11.31 and an absolute magnitude of +12.71, therefore, the star is not visible with the naked eye. It is positioned in the upper left part of the Orion constellation, to the SSE of Betelgeuse. This star is drifting further away with a radial velocity of +30.0 kilometers per second. In the past, this star had a relatively close encounter with the Solar System.

Physical characteristics
This star is a small red dwarf with a stellar classification of M3.5V – an M-type main-sequence star. It is much smaller, cooler, and less massive than the Sun, radiating only 0.6% of the Sun's luminosity. This is a very active star that varies in brightness with an amplitude of  magnitude, modulated by a rapid rotation period of 1.8 days.

According to the SIMBAD database, the star is classified as an eruptive variable.

References

External links 

M-type main-sequence stars
Orion (constellation)
J06000351+0242236
3379